Tsz-Shiou Senior High School is a high school in New Taipei City, Taiwan. It was founded in 1971 by Chen Lu An, eldest son of former vice-president, Chen Cheng a.k.a. Chen Tsyr-shiou, of the Republic of China (Taiwan).

See also
 Secondary education in Taiwan
 List of schools in Taipei
 List of schools in Taiwan

References

External links

 Official website

High schools in Taiwan
Educational institutions established in 1971